Yesterday Girl ("Farewell to Yesterday") is a 1966 drama film directed and written by Alexander Kluge. The film is based on the short story "Anita G." (1962), which is also by Alexander Kluge. The film tells the story of Anita G., a young East German migrant to West Germany and her struggle to adjust to her new life. The film is associated with New German Cinema.

The film won four German Film Awards. The film won a Silver Lion at the Venice Film Festival, whereas Kluge's next film, Artists Under the Big Top: Perplexed even went on to win the Golden Lion, a political scandal due to its progressive leanings which resulted in no Golden Lions being awarded up to 1979.

Cast
 Alexandra Kluge as Anita G.
 Hans Korte as The Judge
 Werner Kreindl as Record company's owner
 Edith Kuntze-Pellogio as Parole Board Officer
 Palma Falck as Mrs. Budeck
 Günter Mack as Ministerialrat Pichota
 Eva Maria Meineke as Mrs. Pichota
  as Assistant at the university

References 

1966 films
1960s avant-garde and experimental films
1966 drama films
German avant-garde and experimental films
German drama films
West German films
Films directed by Alexander Kluge
German black-and-white films
Venice Grand Jury Prize winners
Films based on short fiction
1966 directorial debut films
1960s German-language films
1960s German films